Jordan Elsey (born 2 March 1994) is an Australian footballer who plays as a centre back for Perth Glory in the A-League Men competition.

Playing career
In December 2013, Elsey joined Hong Kong First Division club Kitchee on loan, however he was recalled early and subsequently did not make a senior appearance.

In January 2014, Elsey scored his debut goal for Adelaide United in stoppage time of a match against league leaders Brisbane Roar, giving Adelaide United a surprising 2–1 victory.

On 4 November 2014 Adelaide United confirmed that Jordan had ruptured his Anterior Cruciate Ligament. He made his return to action on 7 November 2015 playing for the Adelaide United Youth side and a return to the senior team later in the season.

In July 2021, Elsey departed Adelaide United at the end of his contract.

On 8 July 2021, Jordan Elsey was announced as a signing by the Newcastle Jets for the upcoming 2021/22 season to play under new manager Arthur Papas.

In January 2023, Elsey departed the Newcastle Jets. Perth Glory confirmed his signing shortly thereafter.

Honours 

Adelaide United
 A-League Premiership: 2015/16
 A-League Championship: 2015–16
 FFA Cup: 2018, 2019

Individual
 National Youth League Most Valuable Player: 2012–13
 Rising Star Award: 2013–14

References

External links
 

1994 births
Living people
Australian soccer players
Association football defenders
Para Hills Knights players
Adelaide United FC players
Newcastle Jets FC players
Perth Glory FC players
FFSA Super League players
A-League Men players